The Ministry of Transport (MOT) is a government agency of Syria that specializes in transport in Syria. Its head office is in Damascus. Since 2020, Zouhair Khazim is the minister.

References

External links

 Ministry of Transport
 Ministry of Transport 

Transport
Syria
Transport organizations based in Syria